Meini is an Italian surname. Notable people with the surname include:
Beatrice Meini (born 1968), Italian mathematician
Ettore Meini (1903–1961), Italian bicycle racer
Mario Meini (born 1946), Italian Catholic bishop

Italian-language surnames